In operator theory, the commutant lifting theorem, due to Sz.-Nagy and Foias, is a powerful theorem used to prove several interpolation results.

Statement
The commutant lifting theorem states that if T is a  contraction on a Hilbert space H, U is its minimal unitary dilation acting on some Hilbert space K (which can be shown to exist by Sz.-Nagy's dilation theorem), and R is an operator on H commuting with T, then there is an operator S on K commuting with U such that

and

In other words, an operator from the commutant of T can be "lifted" to an operator in the commutant of the unitary dilation of T.

Applications
The commutant lifting theorem can be used to prove the left Nevanlinna-Pick interpolation theorem, the Sarason interpolation theorem, and the two-sided Nudelman theorem, among others.

References
Vern Paulsen, Completely Bounded Maps and Operator Algebras 2002, 
B Sz.-Nagy and C. Foias, "The "Lifting theorem" for intertwining operators and some new applications", Indiana Univ. Math. J 20 (1971): 901-904
Foiaş, Ciprian, ed. Metric Constrained Interpolation, Commutant Lifting, and Systems. Vol. 100. Springer, 1998.

Operator theory
Theorems in functional analysis